Frenchkiss Records is an independent record label based in New York City. The label was started in 1999 by Syd Butler, bassist and founder of Les Savy Fav. The label's first purpose was to release Les Savy Fav's second album The Cat and The Cobra, but has since been the label responsible for discovering a varying array of artists such as The Hold Steady, The Antlers, The Dodos, Local Natives and Passion Pit. The label has recently added a music publishing side as well, Frenchkiss Publishing.

The company was acquired by The Orchard in September 2014.

Frenchkiss Label Group
In early 2012 Frenchkiss Records launched the distribution company Frenchkiss Label Group, which is "focused on growing visibility for indie labels in the spirit of communities such as Dischord, Rough Trade and Touch & Go." In May of that year Cavity Search Records was announced as one of the first nine labels to join the Frenchkiss distribution group, along with JAXART and Pendu Sound. At that point, Frenchkiss had ceased its affiliation with RED, and had begun working with The Orchard.

Artists

 1,2,3
 The Antlers
 The Apes
 The Big Sleep
 Bloc Party
 The Bloodthirsty Lovers
 The Bright Light Social Hour
 Call Me Lightning
 Crocodiles
 Cut Off Your Hands
 Detachment Kit
 Devin
 Diet Cig
 The Dodos
 Dream Shake
 Drowners
 The Drums
 Eleanor Friedberger
 Emma Louise
 Ex Models
 Freelance Whales
 Future Generations
 Hello Mary
 The Hold Steady
 ISLAND
 Les Savy Fav
 Lifter Puller
 Local Natives
 The Plastic Constellations
 Passion Pit
 RACES
 Rahim
 S PRCSS
 Sean Bones
 Strange Names
 Sean Na Na
 Smoke and Smoke
 Suckers
 Tangiers
 Thunderbirds are Now!
 Tweens
 Turing Machine
 Young Man

See also
 List of record labels

References

External links
 
 

American independent record labels
Alternative rock record labels
Sony Music